Local elections were held in Sarangani on May 13, 2013, within the Philippine general election. Voters will select candidates for all local positions: a town mayor, vice mayor and town councilors, as well as members of the Sangguniang Panlalawigan, the vice-governor, governor and a representative for the lone district of Sarangani. Incumbent governor Miguel Rene Dominguez is barred for seeking another term because he is limited to three terms only.

Background
On September 9, 2011, although allowed to seek another term, Filipino eight-division world boxing champion and incumbent Representative Manny Pacquiao announced his intention to run for governor. He also announced that he will trade positions with incumbent governor Miguel Rene Dominguez who is on his third term and is not allowed to seek another term.

On April 14, 2012, Pacquiao bolted the Liberal Party and joined the PDP-Laban. Pacquiao became a member of the Liberal Party faction of then Manila Mayor Lito Atienza. He then ran for representative of the 1st District of South Cotabato. However, he lost to then representative and incumbent General Santos mayor Darlene Antonino-Custodio. He then joined the Kabalikat ng Malayang Pilipino of then President Gloria Macapagal Arroyo. In 2010, he ran again as representative of the lone district of Sarangani under the People's Champ Movement which is affiliated with the Nacionalista Party and won over the Chiongbian clan. He then moved to Liberal Party along with other elected representatives.

On October 2, 2012, Pacquiao decided to run for reelection as representative of Sarangani. His wife, Jinkee Pacquiao filed her candidacy for vice governor. She is the running mate of incumbent vice governor Steve Solon.

Provincial Elections
The candidates for governor and vice governor with the highest number of votes wins the seat; they are voted separately, therefore, they may be of different parties when elected.

Candidates for Governor
Parties are as stated in their certificate of candidacies.

Candidates for Vice Governor
Parties are as stated in their certificate of candidacies.

Congressional elections
Sarangani's lone legislative district will elect a representative to the House of Representatives. The candidate with the highest number of votes wins the seat.

Eight-division world boxing champion and incumbent Manny Pacquiao is running unopposed.

Sangguniang Panlalawigan elections
All 2 Districts of Sarangani will elect Sangguniang Panlalawigan or provincial board members.

1st District (West Coast)
Municipalities: Kiamba, Maitum, Maasim
Parties are as stated in their certificate of candidacies.

|-

|-

2nd District (East Coast)
Municipalities: Alabel, Glan, Sarangani, Malapatan, Malungon
Parties are as stated in their certificate of candidacies.

|-

|-

Mayoralty Election
All municipalities of Sarangani will elect mayor and vice-mayor this election. The candidates for mayor and vice mayor with the highest number of votes wins the seat; they are voted separately, therefore, they may be of different parties when elected. Below is the list of mayoralty candidates of each city and municipalities per district.

1st District, Candidates for Mayor
Municipalities: Kiamba, Maasim, Maitum

Kiamba

Maasim

Maitum

2nd District (East Coast)
Municipalities: Alabel, Glan, Malapatan, Malungon

Alabel

Glan

Malapatan

Malungon

References

2013 Philippine local elections
Elections in Sarangani